Norberto Ángeles (6 June 1977 – 17 August 2020) was a Mexican footballer who played as a defender.

Career
Born in San Juan Tepa, Ángeles played for Cruz Azul Hidalgo, Cruz Azul, Querétaro, Lobos BUAP and Callos de Galiente. With Cruz Azul he played in the 2001 Copa Libertadores Finals.

He retired at the age of 29 to run a transportation business.

He died aged 43 from a heart attack.

References

1977 births
2020 deaths
Mexican footballers
Cruz Azul Hidalgo footballers
Cruz Azul footballers
Querétaro F.C. footballers
Lobos BUAP footballers
Club Tijuana footballers
Association football defenders